Sunil Baburao Mendhe is an Indian Politician and a Member of Parliament to the 17th Lok Sabha from Bhandara–Gondiya Lok Sabha constituency, Maharashtra. He won the 2019 Indian general election being a Bharatiya Janata Party candidate.

Sunil Mendhe was born to Smt Pratibha Mendhe & Shri Baburao Mendhe, a middle class family in the year 1968 in Bhandara District, Maharashtra. He Lived and studied with his parents until the age of 16, When upon completion of his school education. He moved to Wardha, Maharashtra to pursue his career interest in Civil Engineering. He had a keen interest in the construction & infrastructure industry. After his completion in Diploma of Civil Engineering and working to gain experience of the industry. he was worked with Ar. ram gopal aswale as a jr engineer. It was in the year 1992, he established his own infrastructure company and achieved great milestones.

As a young boy, he was always inspired by the stories of social workers, patriots and always wanted to contribute to national development. He got in spirit and a platform for his interest of serving the motherland after joining RSS in the year 1987. He was an active member of Rashtriya Swayamsevak Sangh (RSS) since then with responsibilities for various national development activities. He later continued to serve the nation and was involved in Karsewak activity for Ram Mandir and Joined Bajrang Dal as Jilha - Pramukh in the Year 1989. 

Exploring and working in the interest of people, In the year 2016 he got elected as Mayor for Bhandara Municipal Council and further continued to contest Member of Parliament election from Bhandara – Gondia constituency in the year of 2019. He won the 2019 Indian general election as a Bharatiya Janata Party candidate. This Bhandara-Gondia Constituency was considered one of the most difficult seats to win for BJP However, he won the elections by 2 Lakhs Votes.

References

India MPs 2019–present
Lok Sabha members from Maharashtra
Living people
Bharatiya Janata Party politicians from Maharashtra
People from Bhandara
1968 births